This is an incomplete list of notable avalanches.

See also
Avalanche
List of natural disasters by death toll

References

External links

Avalanches in the United States
Death in the United Kingdom
Death in the United States
Avalanches
Avalanche